Hyperaspis transversoguttata is a species of lady beetle native to Turkey and the Middle East. Specimens have been collected from tamarisks.

References

Coccinellidae
Beetles described in 1878